Hari Sri Vidya Nidhi School (HSVNS) is a private co-educational school in Thrissur, Kerala, India. It offers classes from kindergarten to junior college. The kindergarten school is conducted at the Hari Sri Nursery School near the main campus. Hari Sri Vidya Nidhi School was founded in 1978 by Nalini Chandran who was also the school's first principal. The school is registered as a charitable society and is affiliated to the Council for the Indian School Certificate Examinations, which conducts the Indian Certificate of Secondary Education (ICSE) and Indian School Certificate (ISC) exams.

Principals
 Nalini Chandran (1978–1995, 1999–2000)
 Indira Bhaskaran (1996)
 K. Suma (1997–1999)
 Jayanthi Nair (2001–2014)
 Jaya Nagarajan (2014–2021)
 Preetha Venugopal (2022–present)

Notable alumni

Notable alumni include actors Lena, Leona Lishoy, Malavika Wales, and Sreejith Ravi, as well as Carnatic musicians Mahathi and the Trichur Brothers.

References

External links
 

Primary schools in Kerala
High schools and secondary schools in Kerala
Private schools in Kerala
Schools in Thrissur
Educational institutions established in 1978
1978 establishments in Kerala